Stereotaxis Inc. is an American publicly traded corporation based in St. Louis, MO, that makes robotic products to improve the clinical outcomes of electrophysiology studies. The most notable of Stereotaxis’ products is the NIOBE® ES Remote Magnetic Navigation (RMN) System.

With the first iterations of the RMN system originally designed for applications within the brain, its current usage is guiding magnetic catheters during electrophysiology studies and catheter ablation procedures to treat arrhythmias within in the heart. The technology has been approved by regulatory agencies in the United States, European Union and other countries around the world. Systems operate within cardiac catheter labs in hospitals and have been utilized in over 100,000 procedures worldwide as of 2017. In January 2022, Stereotaxis announced that the Fuwai Central China Cardiovascular Hospital has become the first in central China to establish a robotic electrophysiology program with the company's robotic magnetic navigation technology.

System Overview 
The NIOBE® ES Magnetic Navigation System includes two NIOBE® pods which utilize permanent magnets mounted on pivoting arms and positioned on opposing sides of the operating table. The magnets are controlled by physicians from outside of the procedure room by interacting with the NAVIGANT™ software using a mouse, keyboard, joystick, and ODYSSEY® viewing screen. The rotation of the magnets within the Niobe pods influences the magnetic catheters in the heart to make micro movements of the catheter tip (in increments of 1 mm to 9 mm) to navigate throughout the four chambers of the heart and complete the diagnosis and treatment of cardiac arrhythmias.

This process differs from traditional non-robotic procedures where an electrophysiologist stands within the x-ray fluoroscopy field at patient bedside and manipulates a pull-wire catheter by making very fine movements of his or her fingers and wrists at the catheter base and this force is then transferred over the entire length until it reaches the tip of the catheter within the patient’s heart.

References 

Medical devices
Surgical robots
Computer-assisted surgery
Companies listed on NYSE American